Patrick Fischer (born January 2, 1940) is a former American football cornerback in the National Football League (NFL) for the St. Louis Cardinals from 1961 to 1967, and the Washington Redskins from 1968 to 1977.

Fischer attended Westside High School in Omaha and the University of Nebraska–Lincoln.  At Nebraska, Fischer played safety, tailback, and quarterback. Fischer joined the NFL as the 17th-round draft choice of St. Louis in the 1961 NFL Draft.  He then signed with Washington as a free agent in 1968.  He was a 1969 Pro Bowler. In 1972, the Redskins won the NFC championship game of the 1972–73 NFL playoffs against the Dallas Cowboys, when they limited Roger Staubach, their quarterback, to only 9 completions in 20 attempts for 98 passing yards and three allowed sacks, Fischer and Mike Bass, the other cornerback, being particularly successful in shutting down their wide receivers. But though the Redskin defense allowed only 69 net passing yards, it could not stop the Miami Dolphins's running game (184 rushing yards) in losing Super Bowl VII.

Fischer finished his 17-year career with 56 interceptions, and ranks seventh all-time in Redskins career interceptions with 27 and fourth all-time with 412 career interception return yards.  At the time of his retirement, Fischer had played in 213 NFL games, then a record for a cornerback.  He was well known for his strong tackling skills despite his diminutive size.  Some of Fischer's most memorable defensive match-ups occurred against Philadelphia Eagles receiver Harold Carmichael who stood eleven inches taller than Fischer.  Fischer's mantra "get a leg up and you own him" is used today to motivate and teach smaller defensive backs how to defend taller wide receivers.

Any discussion of Pat Fischer raises the question: "Did he invent the bump-and-run?" While playing with the Cardinals, he was teamed in the defensive backfield with Hall of Fame free safety Larry Wilson, who specialized in the safety blitz. The Cardinals were burned a few times by skilled quarterbacks finding the receiver running free into the hole left by the charging Wilson. This was solved by the use of the bump-and-run, a tactic that, fortunately for the Cardinals, Pat Fischer was tailor-made for. From that point on, he made a living of physically harassing receivers. Whether Fischer or his defensive coordinator, Chuck Drulis, invented the coverage is up for continued debate but there can be no doubt that Pat Fischer was the master.

In the late 1980s, NFL Films named Fischer as the Redskins All-Time Neutralizer sponsored by Tums.  After retiring from the Redskins, Fischer worked as a stockbroker and owned a successful real estate business.  In 2003, he was named to the Professional Football Researchers Association Hall of Very Good in the association's inaugural HOVG class.

Fischer was nicknamed "The Mouse" for his relatively small size. As of 2014, Fischer was suffering from "dementia, cognitive decline, and severe memory loss" and was residing in an assisted-living facility.

See also 
 List of NCAA major college yearly punt and kickoff return leaders

References

1940 births
Living people
Sportspeople from Nebraska
American football cornerbacks
Nebraska Cornhuskers football players
St. Louis Cardinals (football) players
Washington Redskins players
Eastern Conference Pro Bowl players
People from St. Edward, Nebraska
Players of American football from Nebraska